Kong Lingwei (born 28 July 1995 in Boli, Qitaihe) is a Chinese female sprinter, the goldlist for 4 × 100 metres relay title at 2014 Asian Games in Incheon. Setting an Asian record of female 4 × 200 metres relay in result of  1:34.89, she ranked the 4th for 200 metres relay at 2015 IAAF World Relays in Bahamas.

References

External links 
 
 

1995 births
Living people
Chinese female sprinters
Asian Games medalists in athletics (track and field)
Asian Games gold medalists for China
Asian Games silver medalists for China
Athletes (track and field) at the 2014 Asian Games
Athletes (track and field) at the 2018 Asian Games
Medalists at the 2014 Asian Games
Medalists at the 2018 Asian Games
People from Qitaihe
Runners from Heilongjiang
21st-century Chinese women